Western New York and Pennsylvania Railroad may refer to:
Western New York and Pennsylvania Railroad (2001), a short line
Western New York and Pennsylvania Railway (1895–1955), predecessor of the Pennsylvania Railroad
Western New York and Pennsylvania Railroad (1887–95), predecessor of the above